This is a list of Bangladeshi films that are scheduled to release in 2021. Some films have announced release dates but have yet to begin filming, while others are in production but do not yet have definite release dates. Films listed as "untitled" do not yet have publicly announced titles.

2021 is scheduled to release numerous notable films that were originally scheduled for release in 2020, but were postponed due to the COVID-19 pandemic, releasing theatrically, on video on demand or on streaming services.

January–March

April–June

July - September

October - December

See also

 List of Bangladeshi films of 2020
 List of Bangladeshi films of 2022
 List of Bangladeshi films
 Cinema of Bangladesh

References

Film
Lists of 2021 films by country or language
 2021